Acrosothrips is a genus of thrips in the family Phlaeothripidae. It is monotypic, being represented by the single species Acrosothrips asymmetricus.

References

Phlaeothripidae
Thrips
Thrips genera
Monotypic insect genera